The Husqvarna TR650 is a dual sport motorcycle made by Husqvarna Motorcycles, a wholly owned subsidiary of Pierer Industrie AG, which designs, engineers, manufactures and distributes motocross, enduro and supermoto motorcycles. The company began producing motorcycles in 1903 at Huskvarna, Sweden, as a subsidiary of the Husqvarna armament firm.

It is powered by a liquid-cooled single-cylinder 652cc engine, two camshafts, and delivers 58 hp (43 kW) at 7,250 rpm and maximum torque of 60Nm at 5,750 rpm.  Countries with graduated rider licensing offer a reduced power version capable of 48 hp (35 kW) and 54Nm of torque.  At the time of the design and manufacture of the TR650, the Husqvarna motorcycle brand was owned by BMW Motorrad and this motorcycle shares many parts in common with other BMW models, including the G650GS, F650GS & F800GS.  The engine is based on the BMW engine used in the F650GS/G650 models

The frame is a split-backbone tubular steel frame.  Front forks are Sachs 46 mm upside-down telescopic forks while the rear is a dual swing arm made of pentagonal steel tubing with a single rear shock and progressive linkage, also supplied by Sachs.

The compression ratio is 12.3:1.

Alternator: 400W

The TR650 was introduced in the 2013 model year and continues in 2014 as the same model.

Models
The TR650 comes in two models:
The Strada in black or red, has ABS standard, and runs on cast rims, 19" front and 17" rear.
The Terra is red, and runs on spoked rims, Front 21", Rear 18" without ABS.  In Europe the Terra is available with a 17" spoked rear wheel and ABS.

Optional equipment
Husqvarna released the following OEM accessories for the TR650 models
Part # 8539523 Alarm System  
Part # 8539605 Hand Guards Set
Part # 8539475 Aluminium Skid Plate
Part # 8539549 High Windshield
Part # 8539550 Heated Grips
Part # 8539660 Off-Road Foot Pegs
Part # 8539604 Rear Soft Bag with support
Part # 8540158 Hard sidebags (2 x 33 liters) with side mounting kit and passenger handles

References

Dual-sport motorcycles